Dominic McGlinchey (1954 – 10 February 1994) was an Irish republican paramilitary leader, who moved from the Provisional IRA to become head of the Irish National Liberation Army (INLA) paramilitary group in the early 1980s.

McGlinchey was one of 11 siblings born into a staunchly republican family from Bellaghy, County Londonderry. In 1971 he was interned without charge for ten months in Long Kesh; not long after his release the following year, he was imprisoned again on arms charges. During his imprisonment, he married his wife Mary in 1975. Together they had three children.

After his release, McGlinchey joined Ian Milne and future Provisional IRA hunger strikers Francis Hughes and Thomas McElwee, and waged a campaign of shooting and bombing throughout the county and beyond. Together, they later joined the Provisional IRA. The gang spent the late 1970s on the run, carrying out operations and evading both the British Army and the Garda Síochána. The latter force arrested McGlinchey in the Republic of Ireland in 1977. He was convicted of hijacking a police vehicle and threatening officers with a gun. In 1982, while serving his sentence in Portlaoise Prison, he clashed with the prison's IRA leadership and was either expelled by them for indiscipline or left the organisation due to strategic differences.

Following his departure from the IRA, McGlinchey joined the INLA. Following his release, due to his experience, he rose through the ranks, becoming chief of staff by 1982. Under McGlinchey, the INLA, which had previously had a reputation for disorganisation, became extremely active in cross-border assassinations and bombings. These included many individual assassinations and woundings, but also massacres such as the Droppin Well bombing of 1982 in which both civilians and soldiers died. There were failed operations, and McGlinchey—who believed that this was the result of an informer in the ranks—devoted much time and energy to finding the cause. Those suspected of betraying the organisation were treated brutally, often by McGlinchey personally. As a result of this resurgence of activity and McGlinchey's high profile, the press nicknamed him "Mad Dog". Under his tenure the Darkley massacre was carried out, ostensibly by another group but using a weapon supplied by McGlinchey. In late 1983, McGlinchey—still on the run—gave an interview with the Sunday Tribune newspaper in which he condemned the Darkley killings but also laid out his political philosophy and plans for the future.

By 1984 McGlinchey had fallen out with members of a powerful Republican family from South Armagh over what he considered missing funds. Men loyal to this family were subsequently killed by McGlinchey's unit, which included his wife. In March the same year, he was captured in County Clare following a gunfight with the Gardaí. At this time, McGlinchey was wanted in the north for the shooting of an elderly woman, but republicans had traditionally been able to avoid extradition by claiming their offences were political. The bloody war in the north was leading the Republic to re-evaluate its position, however, and McGlinchey became the first Republican to be extradited to Northern Ireland. Although convicted and sentenced there to life imprisonment, this was overturned in 1985. As a result, McGlinchey was returned to the Republic, where he was sentenced to ten years' imprisonment on firearms charges. While he was incarcerated, his wife was shot dead at her Dundalk home.

McGlinchey was released in March 1993 and, claiming to have no further involvement with the INLA, moved to Drogheda. He survived an assassination attempt soon after his release from prison, but in February 1994 his enemies caught up with him, and he was shot to death in front of one of his children while using a public phone. Although his and his wife's killers have never been found, they have generally been linked to the deaths of the Armagh men years before.

McGlinchey's posthumous reputation has ranged from being a "psycho" to his enemies to being an inspiration to those who followed him. Commentators have speculated on what he would have contributed to Irish politics had he lived. Some have suggested that he would have contributed to the Northern Ireland peace process, while others have argued that dissident republicans, opposed to that process, would have found him a willing rallying point. McGlinchey has remained an influence on Irish fiction and music, with both Edna O'Brien and Martin McDonagh producing acclaimed pieces based on McGlinchey's life and career. He has also featured in popular songs.

Background
The IRA's last campaign in Northern Ireland, which was called off in 1962, had failed to make an impact on either the government or nationalist consciousness, and contributed towards the organisation's move towards Marxist politics. Since Northern Ireland's creation in 1922, the Catholic minority had suffered from varying degrees of discrimination from the Protestant and Unionist majority. By the middle of the decade, there was a growing popular, peaceful campaign for civil rights for Catholics. The Northern Ireland government accused the campaign of being a front for republicanism and communism, and indeed the IRA had infiltrated it from its foundation. Within a few years, the tension this created between the two sides had descended into violence, and the IRA attempted to position itself as the defenders of the Catholics. However, in 1969, the IRA split into two separate factions. These were the 'Provisional' and 'Official' groups. In 1972, the latter had called a ceasefire and embraced non-violent civil agitation, while the new Provisional IRA had intensified its armed campaign against British forces. Two years later, the Officials expelled Seamus Costello, its Operations Officer for what it termed "factional activity". Costello, dissatisfied with the leadership's group's rejection of armed struggle, proceeded to found a new organisation. This group, he intended, would fight the British as the Provisionals did, yet promote the Marxist politics of the Officials. The INLA, and its political wing, the IRSP, was founded on 8 December 1974 in the Spa Hotel in Lucan, Dublin.

The Officials, comments the journalist Liam Clarke, made a "determined effort to strangle the breakaway INLA at birth". A bloody feud soon broke out between the groups in Belfast which killed six men. Costello had fought in the Border campaign in south County Londonderry "and his reputation still carried weight in the area; his new organisation had no difficulty in winning recruits from the Officials", suggest Holland and McDonald. By 1977, the area's almost entire Official IRA membership had joined them. Founder members included Jimmy Brown, Tom McCartan, Gino Gallagher, Dessie O'Hare, John "Jap" O'Reilly, Gerard "Sparky" Barkley and Gerard "Dr Death" Steenson, most of whom McGlinchey would fight with over the next decade.

Early life
Dominic McGlinchey was born in 1954, in the family home in Ballyscullion Road, Bellaghy, in rural south Londonderry. He was the third of eleven children in a staunchly republican family. His father owned a garage; some of his father's police customers would later die at McGlinchey's hands. His mother Monica was a devout Catholic. McGlinchey had seven brothers and four sisters. Educated at the local school, he was a bright child, although not outstandingly so, classmates later said. When he was 16 he began an apprenticeship in his father's garage. About this time he was joining the numerous civil rights marches that were taking place in the county. His precise reasons for doing so are unclear, but Dillon speculates that "he was reacting to events around him and the idea of participating in marches offered glamour and a close identification with his own community".

Internment and Irish republicanism 
 
In August 1971 the British army launched Operation Demetrius, which involved the mass arrest and of 342 people suspected of being involved with the IRA. McGlinchey was one of those interned as a result, interrupting his fledgeling career as a car mechanic. He spent five days being interrogated in Shackleton Barracks; like his fellow internees, he had no access to either family or legal representation. He was then transferred to Magilligan Prison, and later Long Kesh. There he met IRA veterans from the Border campaign, some of whom ran classes in left-wing politics—based on the writings of Marx and James Connolly—as well as military tactics. One man imprisoned with McGlinchey later recalled him as "a big kid out of his depth" who possessed only a limited knowledge of republican history and ideology. Released in either May or June 1972, his experience appears to have been the catalyst for him to join the physical force movement. that  Coming from a deeply republican area—the failed Border Campaign still a fresh memory—his background gave him "first-class" republican credentials. For those intending to follow such a path, there was still a choice to be had between joining the Official or the Provisional IRAs; McGlinchey chose neither. Instead, he joined with Francis Hughes—a childhood friend—Ian Milne and Tom McElwee, and together they formed their own informal unit. McGlinchey later explained their rationale for doing so during what he called "that colourful period": "You meet fellows who now say they had a political philosophy but they had not. You just went out and did it. When I was doing that at the start. I had no idea I was reacting against the State."

The choice of McGlinchey and Hughes to join the Provisionals was probably, Dillon speculates, based on its local image. Particularly in the clubs and bars McGlinchey frequented, "young Provisionals quickly acquired a hero-worship status", and the movement was rooted in the same romantic nationalism that he had grown up with. Having joined the IRA's South Derry Brigade, he almost immediately went on the run. Often going south for days or weeks at a time, he was able to avoid immediate re-internment. His training, McGlinchey claimed, was rudimentary, later saying "I just picked it up as I went along". Although he occasionally attended IRA training camps with Hughes—who showed an innate aptitude for marksmanship—McGlinchey's skills were in organising and logistics.

McGlinchey was arrested in 1973 for possession of guns, for which he received 18 months imprisonment. Back in Long Kesh, he recommenced his studies in politics and history. This time the class leaders were not old Border campaigners, but relatively young Provisionals. During the period of his incarceration, the external leadership were in secret negotiations with the British government and was considering a ceasefire. McGlinchey did not approve, telling Hughes that he felt that there was an element within the Army Council that was insufficiently committed to the armed struggle.

IRA career

On his release from Long Kesh McGlinchey was appointed "Double O"—Operations Officer—for the region, and lived on the run for the next three years. This promotion, says Dillon, now allowed him to select his own targets. Reuniting with Hughes and the others, he told them that he would not become an "armchair general" and would continue to take part in their operations. They carried out frequent and brutal attacks on the British Army. Their activities, says the author Tim Pat Coogan, became the stuff of legend. Such was their impact, says David Beresford in his book Ten Men Dead—giving the example of their murders of Constables John McCracken and Keneth Sheehan in Magherafelt on 8 April 1977—that the Royal Ulster Constabulary issued wanted posters of McGlinchey and the others. These posters—described by later writers as "an unprecedented step" and "a desperate attempt to elicit public support"—listed at length the bombings, shootings and deaths the men were wanted for.

According to McGlinchey, the trio expanded their theatre of operations—"we didn't confine ourselves to South Derry", he said—after the IRA's failed 1974 ceasefire. Their activities included bombing barracks (for example, Magherafelt and Toomebridge), towns (including Kilrea, Maghera and Ballymena), as well as killing RUC and UDR men. He particularly favoured those of the latter who lived in isolated, exposed houses, as this made them particularly vulnerable. The towns and police stations he targeted were always in strongly nationalist towns, as he felt that not only would the operation be popular but they would have good escape routes. McGlinchey later calculated that this amounted to over 200 operations over "an intricate maze of fields, lanes, country roads and ditches with which they were intimately familiar". They knew where to hide, how to escape, and who was sympathetic to them; the latter provided them not only with food and drink but intelligence on police and army movements. On one occasion in 1977, McGlinchey evaded the RUC in Randalstown, Antrim—three members of which he had just shot at—with the help of a friendly fisherman who hijacked a motorboat and ferried him across Lough Neagh to Tyrone and his escape. The author Ed Moloney interviewed an anonymous IRA man from the time who described McGlinchey's gang, as well as relations between them and the IRA leadership of Martin McGuinness and Gerry Adams.

Dominic McGlinchey, Frank Hughes, and their gang were in Donegal hiding out for a while. They looked like mujahideen, longhaired, scruffy, heavily armed, driving wrecks of cars. They were fed up staying in cow barns when they heard Adams and McGuinness were on holiday in the area. They found out where Adams was staying and turned up at his chalet, where they were sniffily shown the door. There was no way Gerry and Colette would let that crowd darken their door. So then they went to where McGuinness was staying. He was annoyed and cursed them up and down, but he let them in and allowed them to stay.

In June 1973, McGlinchey's unit left a car bomb in Coleraine; six people were killed. McGlinchey was also active in internal security, particularly hunting down those he believed to be assisting the security forces. His victims included a caterer from Derry City who was employed at Fort George British Army base. In March 1977 McGlinchey was allegedly part of a gang that killed 67-year-old Hester McMullan, a retired postmistress, in Toomebridge. They had already shot and wounded her son, an RUC reservist, and she died when they then fired on her house. The IRA claimed the attack. A later commentator described how "the woman had been riddled with bullets during an attack on her house in the early hours of the morning, and other members of her family had narrowly escaped". The SAS placed patrols to intercept McGlinchey in areas their intelligence expected him to be in the north, especially along the border. On one such occasion, believing him to be drinking in a specific bar, they raided the house, firing into the ceiling. The SAS reasoned that the patrons would throw themselves to the floor—all except McGlinchey, whom they expected to reach for a weapon and return fire. However, their intelligence was erroneous; McGlinchey was elsewhere.

Under McGlinchey's leadership, his area became one of the most dangerous areas of Northern Ireland for the security forces. This brought him into confrontation with the IRA leadership, to whom he regularly complained about the quality of his men's equipment ("units in South Armagh had 'better gear' than his teams", he moaned). His repeated requests for more and more powerful arms were denied. For an 18-month period between 1976 and 1977, McGlinchey's unit often cooperated with that of the local INLA, their volunteers often taking part in each other's operations. However, by the spring of 1977 the INLA in the region had suffered a number of damaging arrests. To avoid losing the IRA's best operatives to a similar fate, McGuinness ordered McGlinchey, Hughes and Milne to go to New York and stay for a while with sympathisers. This may also have been a form of exile due to their indiscipline and over-enthusiasm, as McGuinness was rarely able to control them. He also knew that their capture "would have been a major propaganda coup for the authorities". McGlinchey's stay was a lively one; while there, they were wrongly accused of a robbery, which had been committed by an Irish republican fundraiser. McGlinchey wanted to kill the man but was persuaded against it. The three men returned to Ireland soon after this episode.

In 1977, following a mailvan robbery, McGlinchey was arrested in Monaghan for carjacking a Garda patrol vehicle and threatening the officer with a pistol, although McGlinchey claimed that the gun was actually a wheelbrace. He failed to make bail at Dublin's Special Criminal Court after a Garda Superintendent argued that McGlinchey would fail to attend court if bailed. McGlinchey was convicted and sent to the Republic of Ireland's maximum-security Portlaoise Prison. In the north, Hughes and Milne carried on as usual, but some veteran republicans, says Dillon, believed that they had lost an experienced advisor, and following the loss of Hughes, writes the ex-Provisional and lawyer Kieran Hughes, "south Derry was never the same after the break-up of the unit centred on Francis Hughes and Dominic McGlinchey".

During McGlinchey's incarceration, suggests Dillon, he reconsidered his role as an operator. McGlinchey, he says, was aware that the amount of attention he would attract on his release would constrain his freedom of action and possibly endanger those he fought alongside. He may also have been warned by the IRA leadership that, for the same reason, he would be unable to return to a commanding role. Consequentially he appears to have considered looking for a new role in Sinn Féin, probably to provide him with cover while organising overall strategy. But, says Dillon, "the more McGlinchey considered the option of a political role, the less he was enamoured of the idea". He suspected he would dislike taking orders from a Sinn Féin manager, and even more so from one that "had never pulled a trigger". An anonymous ex-volunteer told Dillon that "the prospect of being an armchair general didn't much appeal to [McGlinchey], considering the fact that he hated armchair generals".

Breakdown of relations with IRA
Towards the end of his term, McGlinchey fell out with the IRA's prison leadership, particularly with the ex-Vice President of Sinn Féin, Dáithí Ó Conaill, and the Dublin leadership generally, whom he called "armchair generals". As McGlinchey saw it, they were "sitting in the relative security of Dublin while he and Hughes were out shooting up the countryside of South Derry". The confrontation almost turned physical. Dillon's source told him that McGlinchey "was not a man to back down—that was his nature. There was a rumour that he told O'Connell [Dáithí Ó Conaill] he was nothing but a fucking schoolteacher and an armchair general". This was ill-advised, says the source, as the other IRA prisoners in Portlaoise admired Ó Conaill as a "hero and intellectual".

As a result, McGlinchey and the Provisional IRA parted company, and he joined the INLA. Whose decision this was, remains unclear. The IRA leadership said they expelled McGlinchey from the republican wing for indiscipline; McGlinchey, in turn, claimed the Provisionals "had become too soft". A volunteer who was inside with McGlinchey at the time later recalled how vague the information was: "They say that when he was in Portlaoise that he left the Provos and went to the INLA. The Provos say that he couldn't take orders, he wanted to be the big guy, so they threw him out, court-martialled him...some would say there was other stuff involved." While imprisoned, McGlinchey had begun to develop his political understanding of Irish Republicanism and political philosophy, reading among other, writings by James Connolly, Frantz Fanon, Amílcar Cabral, Che Guevara and the Belgian Marxist Ernst Mandel. The prisoners frequently indulged in political discussions, which expanded McGlinchey's political understanding. The development of McGlinchey's own political radicalism may also have contributed to a decision of his to leave the IRA. Whatever its origins, contemporaries believed his joining the INLA was firmly encouraged by his wife.

McGlinchey maintained regular contact with the outside, and was particularly keen to recruit the last INLA chief of staff—but who had since left the group—back into the organisation. This individual—whose identity remains unknown—seriously considered the offer, but ultimately declined. The reporter Gavin Esler suggests that McGlinchey may have taken a number of disaffected Provisionals from the border region with him to the INLA.

Move to the INLA

Following McGlinchey's move to the INLA, says Coogan, "the subsequent history of the movement is appalling". His defection was a "bitter blow" to McGuinness, say the latter's biographers, as he and McGlinchey had become close friends. But the INLA, argues Dillon, was the only armed group at the time "capable of providing McGlinchey with the action he craved", and for his part, McGlinchey's reputation preceded him. He was released from Portlaoise in 1982, having nearly served five years, and made an "immediate impact" on his new organisation. Immediately appointed to the General Headquarters Staff on release, he was soon given the post of director of operations, while a now-unknown Belfast man was appointed chief of staff in July.

Within a short time of his release, McGlinchey had moved his family from Bellaghy to Dundalk. Here he was better situated to organise INLA operations in the Armagh-Newry-Tyrone-South Derry-South West Antrim area. McGlinchey recruited both disaffected Provisionals and new people, and (ruthlessly) put an end to the group's intermittent internal feuding. Anne Dolan, writing in the Dictionary of Irish Biography, suggests that this was one of the reasons he had been recruited by the INLA in the first place. One of his first actions in office was to contact McGuinness in Derry and attempt a rapprochement. This he saw as having—in terms of exchanging intelligence, for example—advantages for both groups. He still respected McGuinness and when they met, McGlinchey assured him that he would not be against joint operations.

McGlinchey began his INLA career "orchestrat[ing] a sustained bombing campaign" against Unionist leaders with a swathe of—albeit unsuccessful—bomb attacks on their homes and offices. Not only did the INLA fail to hit any of its designated targets, but a number of their operations killed Catholic children, with three dying in Belfast as a result of INLA explosions in a five-month period. These were propaganda disasters for McGlinchey, and, say Holland and McDonald, "gave the INLA a reputation for recklessness". On the political front, The Times reported in May 1983 that the IRSP was considering standing McGlinchey in the East Londonderry constituency for the recently called election. Meanwhile, on McGlinchey's command, the INLA killed Jim Flynn—thought to have been responsible for assassinating Costello—in Dublin in June 1982.

Chief of staff
By June 1983 the INLA chief of staff, McGlinchey's Belfast man, had become unpopular with a number of important figures in the group after a bar-room argument turned ugly. At an Army Council meeting in Ardee held later that month, the Belfast man was sidelined and McGlinchey was elected. This may not have been to his choice; he was later described by those he fought with as someone who would rather rule through proxies than do so directly himself. By now the organisation was on the brink of disintegration. It had been badly hit by the supergrass Harry Kirkpatrick, with many of its best men imprisoned on his statements, and paranoia and internal suspicion were rife as a result. Jack Holland and Henry McDonald comment on the INLA's situation in the early- to mid-1980s:

When the INLA seemed on the verge of collapse, it defied all predictions. Instead of breaking apart, it actually raised its violent campaign to levels of bloodshed and horror never equalled before or since in the organisation's history. One of the reasons it was able to do so was the rise to power of a man who became known throughout Ireland as "Mad Dog" McGlinchey.

McGlinchey introduced the policy of "direct military rule" (DMR) which mandated a policy of execution for all crimes by the group's members and brought the headquarters under the direct control of the chief of staff. McGlinchey was now able to act without reference to the rest of the organisation when he chose. Dolan describes him as "unleash[ing] a reign of personal terror over the undisciplined organisation; opponents and suspected informers were ruthlessly purged", while the Lost Lives team comment that "in practice, [DMR] appeared to give him licence to carry out shootings without reference to the rest of the organisation". As a result of the free licence this policy gave McGlinchey, tensions heightened with other republicans, particularly in South Armagh.

McGlinchey, says Dillon, "soon discovered that it was not an easy task to control some of the men under his command or to prevent what he termed 'botched operations'". Following a series of counter-productive actions in Belfast, McGlinchey refocussed on the rural areas, whose commanders he told to "pull their weight".

Droppin Well bombing

Following McGlinchey's criticism of the Derry Brigade's lack of activity, they devised a plan that met with his approval. The target was the Droppin Well bar in Ballykelly, where, McGlinchey was advised, soldiers from the army base regularly drank. McGlinchey instructed them to proceed with the bombing and to ensure maximum casualties. He knew, but ignored, the near-inevitability of civilian deaths. On 6 December 1982 17 people—11 soldiers of the Cheshire Regiment and six civilians—were killed after a timebomb exploded in the middle of a disco. This  brought the roof of the pub in. To McGlinchey, they—whether Protestant or Catholic—were fraternising with the enemy. Four of the dead were women; the INLA's subsequent claim  of responsibility described them and the other injured women as "consorts". Although McGlinchey later claimed that the bar owner had received multiple warnings against serving soldiers, it is unlikely that any such warnings were given.

Following the Droppin Well bombing, McGlinchey became a "hate figure": DUP MP Willie McRea called for the destruction of "this insane devilish brat McGlinchey" in the House of Commons, calling him a "well-known mass-murderer", while Taoiseach Garret FitzGerald told the Oireachtas that the bombing was a "blasphemous sectarian act". McGlinchey, already a "prime target" for British intelligence, was now called the "most wanted man in Ireland". The British Government had been attempting to persuade that of the Republic to extradite republicans to face justice in the North for many years, with no success. The Ballykelly bombing encouraged the Irish court to reconsider its position: the following day, Ireland's Supreme Court ordered McGlinchey to be extradited to Belfast in response to an earlier RUC request for McGlinchey to be returned to them to face trial for the murder of Hester McMullan. This was despite the INLA being still a legal organisation at that point and McGlinchey himself—having already absconded from bail while in the north—being on the run and unobtainable. The court's decision was a dramatic break with precedent, and a controversial one, as the Republic objected to the use of Diplock courts in the north; it had rejected 48 similar applications from the north since 1970; this was the first such extradition since the creation of the Irish Free State in 1922. McGlinchey, in absentia, fought the decision. Although he rejected accusations of involvement in the murder, he claimed—in the words of the Extradition Act of 1965—that the Toomebridge operation had been "a political offence or an offence connected with a political offence". Through his solicitors, McGlinchey presented evidence of his IRA active service at the time in the form of wanted posters, charge sheets and articles naming him in the Ballymena Guardian. This was not accepted, and McGinchley re-approached his challenge, this time basing it on the clause of the Act which prevented extradition if there were grounds for believing that, following transfer the individual would then in any case still be prosecuted for political offences. In a two-hour hearing, Chief Justice Tom O'Higgins rejected this claim also. He recorded the court's opinion that "modern terrorist violence...is often the antithesis of what could reasonably be regarded as political, either in itself or in its connections". Higgins also declared that whether the victim of the alleged political offence—in McGlinchey's case, Hester —was killed or not was irrelevant to the question; the important point, he stressed, was that she was a civilian. "An elderly grandmother riddled with bullets", he continued, was in no way what "reasonable civilised people would regard as political activity". Public interest in McGlinchey's extradition subsided following the judgement, as, notes the jurist Alpha Connelly, he "did not oblige the Irish authorities by presenting himself to them for the purpose of extradition pursuant to the Supreme Court judgment".

Internal security 
McGlinchey only ever crossed the border into Northern Ireland when an operation required it, which made it harder for the security services to maintain effective surveillance. In spite of secret surveillance south of the border, the Special Reconnaissance Unit had difficulty monitoring McGlinchey, argues the journalist Peter Taylor. As a result, they "did the next best thing and latched on to an INLA associate", Seamus Grew. Grew was a close friend of Mary McGlinchey. By tailing Grew north of the border, the SRU hoped to be led to McGlinchey. The RUC's intelligence arm, E4A, believing him to be in Armagh, thought they knew the route he would be taking back to the south. Six days after the Droppin Well bombing, Grew and another INLA member Roderick "Roddy" Carroll, were shot dead at an RUC checkpoint while driving through Mullacreevie. McGlinchey—the intended target—had been seen getting into their car in the south by The Det surveillance. He was believed to be bringing a bag of guns into the north. This was not the case; the handbrake was on, and neither were Grew or Carroll armed. It seems probable that he had been in the vehicle a few minutes earlier, but had alighted before reaching the roadblock, with what the Belfast priest and peace activist Fra Raymond Murray has called an "instinctive intuition". Dillon posits that the army had a shoot-to-kill policy with regard to McGlinchey, believing him to be always heavily armed and unlikely to surrender without a fight.

The deaths of Grew and Carroll reinforced McGlinchey's conviction that there was a mole in the organisation with the sole intention of "setting up McGlinchey". Six months after Grew and Carroll were killed, McGlinchey believed he had found the source of E4A's information: Eric Dale, he believed, had provided the RUC with the information they required to locate Grew and Carroll.

On the evening of 3 May 1983, McGlinchey personally led the gang who kidnapped Dale in front of his girlfriend, Claire McMahon, in Monaghan. She later said that the men originally said they wanted to speak to Dale "about guns or something that was missing". McGlinchey's role in the operation was to keep McMahon calm in the front room while other gang members interrogated Dale in the hallway. Mary McGlinchey was part of this team. McMahon later said that the only time she saw her partner again he was lying face-down on the floor surrounded by six people with guns. Dillon describes McGlinchey's appearance that night:

McGlinchey's balaclava had slits for his eyes and stretched below his chin; he wore a combat jacket, and a shoulder holster resting on his chest contained a .44 magnum revolver. His right hand was positioned near the gun butt and his left held the holster.

McGlinchey told Claire that Dale would be returned to her shortly, and then emptied McMahon's car boot and bundled Dale into it. McGlinchey told her that if she had not heard from Dale by morning, she was to make her way to Culloville for information; McMahon, realising that the gang were going to steal her car as well, asked how she was expected to travel from Monaghan to South Armagh without a vehicle. She was not to see Dale again; his body was found four days later outside Killean. An INLA statement claimed that he had been executed for—among other things—trying to establish the whereabouts of "an alleged INLA man wanted on both sides of the border". This was an indirect reference to McGlinchey himself. As the Dale case illustrates, McGlinchey occasionally tortured his victims, often "with the aid of instruments such as a red-hot poker", says Coogan, often using Tom McCartan, a "quick-tempered and violent man", for such work.

McGlinchey's efforts in counterintelligence did not stand in the way of the armed campaign. In May 1983 both McGlincheys, with two other men, took part in a drive by gun attack on a Cookstown checkpoint, him with a machine gun and her using a pistol. A police constable reservist, Colin Carson, was killed and fire was exchanged between those in the van and the RUC in a sangar. McGlinchey's fingerprints were later found in the van. The operation, said the UPI at the time, was claimed by the IRA's Tyrone Brigade as their responsibility, although it is generally considered to have been carried out by McGlinchey's group.

Money and weapons were essential for the INLA's campaign, and McGlinchey—by now accompanied by Dessie O'Hare—organised a number of bank and Securicor robberies, on one occasion stealing £100,000 in a single raid. This allowed tentative plans to buy arms from the United States to be put into effect, although, in the event, the plan came to nothing. Another two robberies in Cork brought the group £300,000 between them. Another favourite fundraising technique was fraud, one case of which was meant to have netted the group £140,000 in stolen bankers' orders. However, Éamon McMahon from South Armagh, whose job it was to cash the orders, paid nothing. McMahon was an associate of Patrick Mackin—with whom McGlinchey was involved in a personal feud—and, to resolve the issue, both men agreed to meet Mary McGlinchey in the Imperial Hotel in Dundalk. Trusting her, suggest Holland and McDonald, "was a fatal mistake": Mary had lured them there for her husband to kill.

British intelligence also continued its attempts to capture McGlinchey. One extreme tactic, allegedly used in October 1983, was described by The Guardian as "badly botched". A fake tour operator called Caruso, under cover of an address in London's Albemarle Street, wrote to Tony and Margaret Hayde in September informing them that they had one third-prize in a competition, an all-expenses-paid week in Torremilenos. The Haydes were founder members of the IRSP, and The Times reported that "the couple, who admit to having met Dominic McGlinchey, allegedly INLA chief of staff and Ireland's most wanted man, say they were offered immediate cash and the promise of a further £10,000 in return for information".

By the end of 1983, relations with the Derry IRA had become fraught. The IRA had publicly condemned an INLA no-warning carbomb, and a number of IRA men had equally publicly left the organisation for the INLA. Matters came to a head in early December when an INLA man was accused of stealing an IRA gun, to which he retaliated by threatening senior Derry republicans. McGuinness, in an attempt to forestall a feud, contacted McGlinchey—both men had stayed in contact after McGlinchey had left—for assistance. McGlinchey met his man in Dundalk and instructed him to return the gun, in exchange for assurances as to the volunteer's safety. In an attempt to restore the peace, in a December 1983 interview with the Starry Plough, McGlinchey supported Sinn Féin's decision to increase its political involvement in the Republic and called for greater cooperation in the north between the two groups.

INLA violence continued alongside fundraising ventures and personal vendettas, although often unsuccessfully. For example, two operations had been planned for 13 August 1983. An RUC reservist was to be killed at a checkpoint in Markethill, while in Dungannon the police station was to be shot up. Both attempts were failures. At Markethill the unit failed to kill any police, while in Dungannon the INLA unit was ambushed and two volunteers shot dead. At the debriefing of the surviving volunteers, an attendee later recalled, McGlinchey "went mad and called us all stupid cunts". McGlinchey was also concerned about the loyalty of certain members of his Belfast Brigade, a number of whom were summoned to the Ardee farmhouse in late October 1983. Also kidnapped and brought to Ardee at the same time was ex-INLA member Gerard "Sparky" Barkley, who had been a close friend of Kirkpatrick. Although Barkley had publicly left the organisation, McGlinchey suspected him to be robbing banks with INLA weapons but not paying over anything to his old comrades as would be expected. Barkley swore that he was now merely an "ODC", or ordinary decent criminal. He was not believed. Following interrogation, Barkley was shot on McGlinchey's orders by either Paul "Bonanza" McCann or Mary McGlinchey.

Darkley massacre

On 21 November 1983 two armed men walked into the Pentecostal Church in Darkley, South Armagh. They opened fire on the congregation, who were singing "Are You Washed in the Blood of the Lamb?", and shot a number of worshippers, three of whom died with many more injured. A previously unknown group calling itself the Catholic Reaction Force soon claimed responsibility for the killings, which it called a "token retaliation". The RUC confirmed that weaponry used in previous INLA operations had been used. The INLA, however, denied involvement and condemned the attack, although McGlinchey later acknowledged the presence of an INLA volunteer in the group to whom, McGlinchey admitted, he had loaned a Ruger rifle. McGlinchey expressed dismay at the attack and seems to have been unaware it was to take place, but notwithstanding this, the political damage was done and his name was now linked firmly to violent sectarianism. The attack had been the idea of a Belfast INLA man as revenge for the death of his brother at the hands of loyalists; he told McGlinchey that he wanted weapons to target a known UVF man.

McGlinchey quickly acted to put distance between himself and the Darkley massacre. Referring to the reason for the attack he had originally been given, he claimed that the INLA man, following the death of his brother, involved"must have been unbalanced or something to have organised this killing". In an interview with the IRSP's newspaper, The Starry Plough, he stated of the Darkley killings: "I condemn them. Those people were only hillbilly folk who had done no harm to anyone. They are in no way a legitimate target. These killings are contrary to republican socialism. They cannot be defended." Coogan also suggests that the man who planned the attack was "clearly deranged". The Irish anthropologist S. Bruce argues that McGlinchey's approach can "reasonably" be inferred to have been that "if Protestants get caught in the cross-fire, they deserve it".

Darkley was yet another propaganda disaster for the INLA, and whether McGlinchey liked it or not, symbolised what it was best known for. The murders heightened McGlinchey's profile further, and, argue Holland and McDonald, for much of 1983 "Ireland and Britain were gripped by 'Mad Dog' fever". McGlinchey—still on the run—was reportedly spotted all over the island. McGlinchey's tactics for evading capture, the Gardaí later reported, included never staying in the one place too long and frequently disguising his appearance. On one occasion, claimed The Guardian, his disguise was good enough to enable him to attend his sister's wedding "and that not even those standing in the church during the ceremony realised that he was there".

Sunday Tribune interview
Six days after the Darkley attack, McGlinchey gave an interview to the Sunday Tribune, conducted by its editor, Vincent Browne. Browne said that the public had a right to know about McGlinchey, and McGlinchey was keen to put his side of the story across, as by now the IRA had also condemned Darkley as purely sectarian. He appears to have offered the BBC the opportunity to interview him first, but they declined. Browne and McGlinchey talked for four hours, only being interrupted for occasional refreshment. Browne later annotated his notes of the interview, describing McGlinchey as speaking "with a soft Derry accent...for the most part, relaxed, composed and fairly articulate". Browne suggested that the term "Mad Dog" seemed misapplied to the man he interviewed although also that "there is a coldness about him in relation to the consequences of his actions which is chilling". Browne realised that McGlinchey was not used to speaking with journalists, as he was "quite devoid of the caution and guile" Browne was usually met with by his subjects. McGlinchey may, Browne said, have been overly tired. Conversely, Browne noted, the pressure of the situation may have sharpened McGlinchey's wits, for Browne wrote that McGlinchey soon "perked up" and became "unusually well able to carry the drift of an argument through several convolutions". Their conversation shifted from Irish politics to the global; this may have been deliberate on McGlinchey's part to distract from the Darkley attack and questions as to his own role in it. Browne discussed McGlinchey's preferred tactics on an operation, asking, for example, whether McGlinchey ever saw the face of his victim:  

Usually, for I like to get in close, to minimise the risk for myself. It's usually just a matter of who gets in first and by getting in close you put your man down first. It has worked for me down the years. I wouldn't be as good as they are [the security forces] shooting it out over distances because I don't get the opportunity for weapons and target training like they do. So I believe in getting in close'.

The last time this had happened, added McGlinchey, was "the Cookstown job", referring to the death of Constable Carson in May that year. McGlinchey described how he "went up to the bunker outside the police station and just opened up on the policeman in the bunker". One of the few times McGlinchey seemed uneasy in the interview, wrote Browne, was when he was asked about the children of McGlinchey's victims, to which he replied in generalities. He also became agitated, saying that he refused to be "blackmailed by the grief of children". McGlinchey showed no remorse for his activities, said Browne, only a "frightening indifference". After the interview was published, the Gardaí visited the Tribune's offices and studied it minutely to extract any clue as to his whereabouts. In Britain, The Guardian newspaper described McGlinchey's availability for interviewing by anyone he wanted "embarrassing" for the Gardaí at a time when the police were under pressure to capture him.

Capture 
The manhunt for McGlinchey and his gang involved hundreds of soldiers and Gardaí, while the media "followed their trail around the Republic in some awe". A Gardaí patrol eventually discovered him accidentally in Cork City on 2 December 1983. Far from being a police triumph, the encounter was "one of the more farcical incidents" among what Dolan calls their "picaresque" manhunt. Two Gardaí knocked on the door and, receiving no answer, attempted to force an entry. McGlinchey−with Mary−and comrades were covering them with their guns as the police entered. A later report suggested that Mary had wanted to kill them, but her husband restrained her. The republicans made them strip at gunpoint—a tactic McGlinchey used a number of times in encounters with the Gardaí—and tied them up. The officers took three hours to escape from their bonds, by which time McGlinchey and his gang had stolen a car and escaped with the help of a local man. McGlinchey's "humiliation" of the Gardaí, says Dillon, "energised" the manhunt. It also, suggests Coogan, "inject[ed] something of a Robin Hood element" to republican propaganda, as well as—by making them "peel off" their uniforms—"adding a new definition to the tern 'peeler'". The gang were armed with automatic assault rifles, pump-action shotguns and short arms.

McGlinchey and his gang were eventually captured on his way to meet his children—on which account, he later said, he panicked when he was surrounded—on St Patrick's Day 1984 in County Clare. They holed himself up in the house of John Lyons, a musician; although Lyons was absent, his wife and children were at home, hostages for McGlinchey. The Gardaí's Security Task Force—numbering 40 men—did not expect to be able to force his surrender, so they were accompanied by the Irish Army who were equipped with Uzi submachine guns. As the police drove up to the house, McGlinchey opened fire on the leading vehicle from an upstairs room. Garda Chris Power was hit in the shoulder, and was forced to remain in the car for safety while the firefight took place, even though he was bleeding heavily. Both sides exchanged shots, until a priest was sent in to negotiate with McGlinchey from the bottom of the stairs. At 7:15pm, having been wounded, and to safeguard Mrs Lyons, and both their children—McGlinchey's were nearby, in the care of a supporter—he surrendered. The priest, Father Timothy Tuohy, later told how McGlinchey and his gang wanted him to stay with them as they left the house, expressing fears that they would be assassinated if there were no witnesses.

Extradition, imprisonment, release and imprisonment

Following McGlinchey's arrest, he was interrogated in Ennis police station. In Dublin, events moved fast. The Supreme Court had already authorised his extradition to the north, and now had to be "hastily convened"—since it was the evening of a bank holiday—to action it. This occurred "fairly promptly", noted Gemma Hussey, Minister for Employment Affairs and Social Protection, in her cabinet diary. There was some uncertainty as to whether McGlinchey would be extradited immediately or be prosecuted in the south for his offences there first. McGlinchey appealed the decision, questioning the constitutionality of the 1965 Act. This was rejected ex tempore by the court. In O'Donnell's words, thanks to the Attorney General Peter Sutherland "and an unprecedented" court sitting, within 18 hours of his arrest in Clare he was transferred to the RUC at the Killeen border checkpoint. This took place at around 1am on the morning of 18 March 1984 and had been the fastest extradition in Irish history. It was also the first: no republican had ever been extradited from the Republic to the North. McGlinchey appointed a Newry man called "Jap" chief of staff during McGlinchey's enforced absence. McGlinchey's extradition was criticised in the Republic by those who wished him to face justice first for the crimes he had committed there "before caving in on the important principle of extradition". The British Secretary of State for Northern Ireland, James Prior, hailed the arrest as "a major victory in the struggle against terrorism",  while the MEP for Northern Ireland, John Taylor called it "the best news to come out of Dublin for many years". Sinn Féin said the extradition had caused "a sense of treachery and anger" in the Nationalist community; The Economist wrote that, while "the IRA had no love for Mr McGlinchey...it must fear the creation of precedents that could affect its own gunmen". The largest opposition political party in the Republic, Fianna Fáil, "kept an uneasy silence while some backbenchers protested" against it, while the Taoiseach gave it his "vigorous backing".

A month after McGlinchey's capture, The Economist suggested that McGlinchey faced "only a single, seven-year-old murder charge, which could be hard to prove". While he was on remand, McGlinchey's daughter Maíre died of meningitis. He was released on parole to attend her funeral in Bellaghy. Nearly six months after his extradition, McGlinchey appeared in court for the murder of Hester McMullan in December 1984. Five crown witnesses failed to appear, but the Crown used McGlinchey's own admissions to the SCC regarding his IRA activity as evidence on Christmas Eve Justice Hutton sentenced McGlinchey to life imprisonment. Following what Arizona jurist Michael P. P. Simon calls a "controversial and politically sensitive decision", Coogan says that it then "soon became clear that the Northern authorities had little or no evidence" on which to hold McGlinchey. He was released by Belfast Appeal Court the following year. Lord Justice Gibson found that McGlinchey's previous confession to the Garda regarding his IRA membership did not necessarily mean that he was involved in every action the IRA carried out in the area. Further, Gibson ruled that the fingerprints that had been found on the getaway car could have been placed on the vehicle up to 30-hours after Hester's death. Both McGlinchey's confession to membership, and his fingerprints, said Gibson in a 45-minute judgment, were thus inadmissible as evidence.

Return to the Republic
Having been the first republican to have been extradited from the south to the north, on 11 October 1985 he also became the first person to be re-extradited from the north back. The then-leader of Sinn Féin, Gerry Adams, later joked in Fortnight magazine that the Catholic Church was insistent that "although reports that Mr McGlinchey was seen to move have been verified by many observers, his movements back and forth across the border do not meet the conditions used to describe a mirable". McGlinchey was handed back to the Gardaí at the Killeen border crossing, and immediately re-arrested on charges relating to the Clare siege. As well as Gardaí Special Branch armed with Uzis, McGlinchey was greeted by spectators with placards, note Holland and McDonald. Of these read céad míle fáilte, while another said "Welcome home, Daddy". By this point, argues Coogan, "the pendulum of public opinion had swung back towards him considerably". His photograph had appeared in the news often enough for the "Mad Dog" image to appear a misnomer, and his wife and young children were photogenic.

McGlinchey was convicted at the Special Criminal Court in March 1986 for firearms offences from two years earlier. The presiding judge, Mr Justice MacMahon commented during his sentencing that "it was to his credit" that MvGlinchey had not fired on the Gardaí although having had many opportunities to do so. McGlinchey was sent to Portlaoise for 10 years, where he became a model prisoner, immersing himself in the study of constitutional and extradition law, on which he became expert. As a result, he became an informal advisor to other prisoners and was able to dismiss his barristers and prosecute his own appeals. The Supreme Court advised McGlinchey to seek payment of the state aid paid to defence counsel as he was acting on his own behalf. McGlinchey's appeals failed in Ireland and then also in the European Court of Human Rights. He then appealed to the Supreme Court again, on the new grounds that the 1981 warrant from Belfast was flawed. Justice Declan Costello initially agreed, noting that the police officer upon whose oath it had been issued had failed to sign it as he should have. However, said Costello, there were sufficient safeguards in the extradition process to have allowed McGlinchey to have presented this evidence on an earlier occasion; he had not done so, and the appeal was therefore dismissed. Dillon suggests that during this period of imprisonment, McGlinchey reconsidered the direction of his life, resolving to retire from military activity and become a family man. On the outside, though, McGlinchey was beginning to be seen as a potential leader for a disaffected group of Provisionals from the East Tyrone Brigade. McGlinchey, they knew, "had even less regard for the Adams leadership than the East Tyrone men".

INLA feuding

While McGlinchey was in Portlaoise he could not control external events. In December 1985 members of the INLA in the north were released after their convictions in the supergrass trials, including a previous chief of staff, Gerard Steenson. Many of them—already distrustful of each other after Kirkpatrick's many allegations and the "dirty laundry aired" as a result—came into conflict with each other as they attempt to retake the positions in the group. Their conflict soon descended into a violent feud, with the INLA effectively splitting into four distinct factions. The mass-imprisonments following Kirkpatrick's evidence had been extremely damaging for the INLA, and between December 1986 to March 1987 there were 12 deaths—including much of the IRSP and INLA leadership—and many more injuries in an increasingly bloody feud.

Killing of Mary McGlinchey
Mary McGlinchey—called "Mrs Mad Dog" by the ex-soldier and writer Ken Wharton—may have continued to organise her husband's operation while he was incarcerated, perhaps even running it. Publicly, she appears to have distanced herself from political activity (notwithstanding, noted The Sunday Tribune, that "her window displayed a Sinn Féin election poster"). She probably to have supported the faction still controlled by her husband's man—"Jap" O'Reilly—in the INLA's faction feuding but not to the extent of playing a direct role.

On 1 February 1987,  at around 9:20pm, at the family home in Dundalk, she was bathing their two children upstairs when two-balaclava-clad men broke into through the back door and ran upstairs. They fired at Mary McGlinchey with automatic weapons, shooting her in the face. Declan, the eldest child, escaped out of the house and raised the neighbours, who found Mary shot, with her head in the bath. Regional newspaper The Argus later reported that the killing "caused shock waves in the town".

RTÉ reported the next day that McGlinchey had been asleep in the ground floor block of Portlaoise's E-Wing—which housed, in part, "members and former members of the INLA"—when prison authorities were informed of his wife's killing. McGlinchey was awakened and moved to another section of the prison, where he was given the news. However, noted RTÉ, "the prison authorities refused to disclose what his reaction was", that being personal information. When asked whether his move had been because McGlinchey was considered to be in danger among other INLA men, the prison official said it was "prudent and in the best interests of everyone". The McGlinchey children were taken into care by Brigid Makowski, who had previously been their legal guardian. Mary's inquest was delayed three months as McGlinchey's counsel argued he had only been informed two days earlier and had not had sufficient time to instruct him.

Holland and McDonald argue that "because [McGlinchey] was the personification of all that happened to the INLA from 1982 to early 1984, those who suffered under his reign blamed McGlinchey personally." Many people—including some republicans—wanted him dead. She is known to have taken an active part in McGlinchey's activities; the RUC wished to question her in the matter of 20 deaths, and had made enemies of her own, particularly by luring victims for her husband's execution squads. The method of her murder also, says Dillon, "implied personal revenge". With McGlinchey in enforced absence in Portlaoise, it is likely that her killers took advantage of the general chaos of the on-going INLA feud to settle an old score. Although it is unclear exactly what was requested and what was denied, Holland and McDonald state that McGlinchey applied for permission to attend her funeral. This was refused by the Department of Justice on the grounds of the security risk. McGlinchey was reported as being "devastated" by her death. Although the Justice Department offered him the opportunity to hear a private service for his wife within the prison—with his children and close friend Bernadette Devlin McAliskey attending—McGlinchey refused, demanding he be allowed to the funeral itself.

Mary may have been killed by the same gang that would later be responsible for McGlinchey's death, part of a "long-running feud", suggested a group of Belfast journalists researching the conflict's mortality rate. It may also have been over money. Coogan suggests that her killers—who blamed her for the part she played in the deaths of McMahon and Mackin—flew in from the United States the day before and having shot her with borrowed guns, "were back on a plane to America the next day". Both the Gardaí and the INLA judged it an IPLO operation, and within a few days the latter had assassinated one of that group. The IRSP concurred, their spokesman Kevin Quillan saying in a radio interview the next day that they "could quite clearly state that we would lay the blame for this brutal murder at the door of the so-called IPLO, one of the factions of these dissident groupings", and further suggested that the IPLO received the assistance of British intelligence in targeting Mary McGlinchey. However, her death appears to have been unconnected with it. McGlinchey wanted to investigate Mary's death, but he was hampered by the fact that no-one was willing to discuss it with him while the feud was still on-going. Her death also put an end to the on-going contact between the INLA and the disaffected elements of the East Tyrone Brigade who had contacted McGlinchey. After their mother's death, Declan and Dominic lived with their maternal and paternal grandparents, in Toomebridge and Bellaghy respectively.

Following his wife's death, McGlinchey released a statement from Portlaoise in which he denounced the INLA's feud and said that neither he nor Mary had had any dealings with the group since his incarceration begun. Therefore, he said, there was no reason for any organisation to play any part in her funeral.

In October 1992 McGlinchey applied for temporary parole in order to see his children over the public holiday, but the request had been turned down on security reasons. Two months later he applied again, this time to spend five days over Christmas with them. This request was accepted. McGlinchey was released for good in March the following year. He had served seven of his 10-year sentence. He announced his intention of refocussing the INLA's efforts on investigating the money laundering activities of the UVF and its connections with Irish gangsterism. Still  politically hardline, he condemned the on-going Hume–Adams talks, as well as the Downing Street Declaration, which he considered a betrayal of the republicanism's ethos.

Later career
Following his release, McGlinchey lived temporarily in Dublin and then moved to 62 Meadowview, south Drogheda. He found part-time work in a nearby supermarket. He spent time with his children, taking them on holiday to the Aran Islands. The journalist Maggie O'Kane later described McGlinchey's last days: "Since his release from prison last year he had lived on the east coast of Ireland in the town of Drogheda in a house attached to Thornton's grocer's shop and video store. Locals tended to boycott it when they heard McGlinchey had arrived. They believed his occasional appearances at the counter were a cover for a new armed gang he was forming in the Republic". His old organisation, meanwhile, had continued its campaign, on his release, attempting—but failing—to kill a UVF man in north Belfast in January 1993, for example.

If McGlinchey had decided to turn his back on armed struggle, suggests Dillon, within a short space of time he discovered that his enemies had not. In June 1993, he was driving to his son Dominic's birthday party in Newtowndarver, Dundalk. A car pulled up next to him, and McGlinchey, probably thinking it was the Gardaí, approached it. A man with a machine gun got out, but as he was cocking the weapon, McGlinchey grabbed hold of it: a short of fire skimmed McGlinchey's head, but the weapon jammed. The attacker then drew a pistol, with a number of shots hitting McGlinchey; he, however, was able to take cover in a shrubbery. Coogan comments that one of McGlinchey's children ran after the car to take its number. Although McGlinchey survived the attack, a bullet was lodged in his skull. This and others were removed under surgery. McGlinchey was kept under armed guard while recovering in hospital.

The identity of the gunmen is unknown. McGlinchey, at different times, blamed both British Intelligence—he said his attackers had English accents—and the Loyalist leader Billy Wright, whom McGlinchey had previously attempted to assassinate. The IPLO also claimed responsibility, although McGlinchey rejected the suggestion. Reiterating his view that British intelligence was responsible, he claimed that "the only people who would gain from me going home to Bellaghy in a box were the British". McKittrick suggests that there was much contemporaneous speculation as to the involvement of South Armagh republicans. Others have also suggested that it was a UVF operation, or perhaps carried out by friends of Sparky Barkley. Holland and McDonald comment, however, that:

The choice of venue to gun down one of Ireland's most notorious paramilitary figures...pointed to the real identity of the gang. It was not an accident that they had chosen the spot near Ardee, County Louth, because it was there that he assumed the leadership of the INLA almost exactly ten years before.

Notwithstanding his disowning of the INLA, McGlinchey, it seems, also had scores to settle, for both the attack on him and the death of his wife. When he was released from Portlaoise he said had a death-list naming 15 enemies. Some contemporaries, though, have stated that he appears to have mellowed after Mary's death. He had moved to Drogheda and was now living in near-anonymity; few of his neighbours were aware of his past. He may have felt that having effectively left the INLA, his enemies would forget him—or at least, argues Dillon, not risk travelling that far into the Republic of Ireland to target him. He was still involved with the movement ideologically, however, and with McAliskey, he was working on a draft constitution for a united Ireland. Comments Dolan, "although there were some suggestions that he was trying to assemble a new republican unit and returning to the racketeering he had engaged in throughout the 1980s, he strongly denied it". For their part, the Gardaí believed him responsible for a number of armed robberies that took place in Counties Louth and Tipperary in early 1994. According to McGlinchey's son Dominic, speaking in 2014, his father was working alongside a senior Provisional IRA man investigating links between a corrupt IRA unit and the UVF in Dublin.

Death

In Northern Ireland, by spring 1994, writes Moloney, "the violence continued apace...with both republicans and loyalists killing freely". The INLA's 1986–1987 feud had also reignited. Sinn Féin, on the other hand, was actively promoting a strategy of peace to the IRA and the mainstream republican movement. A former Provisional explained to Dillon why McGlinchey was more personally vulnerable at this time than he probably realised. Part of McGlinchey's problem, the volunteer said, was that after his release McGlinchey "no longer had a terrorist group to protect him". The source said that, without the safe-houses, the intelligence reports, the support network and the instinctive security precautions that had guided his life on the run, he had become "as vulnerable as some of those people [he] used to target. That was McGlinchey's problem. He failed to understand that he'd become a sitting duck". Effectively, argues the journalist Fergal Keane, by the time of McGlinchey's death, "there was no-one left in the organisation to protect him".

At around 9:30 on the evening of Thursday, 10 February 1994, McGlinchey had visited friends of his in Duleek Road, near his home, and dined there. He left around forty minutes later, intending to take a video back to a shop in Brookville, on the north side of town. McGlinchey later described his father's demeanour that night as "agitated and emotionally upset". He said he asked his father whether he believed himself to be in danger from the IRA, to which McGlinchey replied "I am just sick of my name being blackened by men who never fired a shot...no, the IRA would never kill me, son". At around 11pm McGlinchey and the 16-year-old Dominic were returning home, when—"for reasons never made clear", says Dillon—McGlinchey pulled up to make a phone call from a public kiosk on Hardman's Gardens, near Lourdes Hospital. Almost immediately—despite the presence of four witnesses—a red Mazda pulled up alongside him. While his son watched from the car, three men got out and beat McGlinchey. Once McGlinchey was on the ground the men—who were armed with three pump action shotguns and a pistol—fired into him 14 times. The attack finished with a coup de grâce to the head, although he was dead already. His last words were reputed to be "Jesus, Mary help me"; his son yelled for an ambulance. According to the first officer on the scene, Dominic junior told her, "it's my dad, it's my dad, he's been shot. Quick, get up the checkpoints". "The horrifying impact of witnessing such cold brutality on McGlinchey's son can only be guessed at", observe Holland and McDonald.

The following day, an autopsy was carried out in Our Lady of Lourdes Hospital, which showed McGlinchey had been hit in the neck, skull, the left upper chest, the left arm, and both legs. His inquest was held in Drogheda two weeks later, suspended and then reopened in November 1996. Gardaí forensic officers told the coroner that they had compared the shell casings they had found with the database, but no matches had been made to other known weapons; the officer noted that, as of that time, no such information had been received from the RUC. The shotguns used were impossible to trace ballistically, but it had been ascertained that the Mazda was registered in the north. Bernadette McAliskey made a statement for the family, in which she condemned the Gardaí's investigation into the McGlinchey's killing and suggested that the killers were two known UVF men from the north. Further, she said

Despite the fact that he was himself under constant Garda surveillance, despite a previous attempt on his life and the existence of photo fit identification of two assailants in that attempt and the fact that they bear an uncanny resemblance to two known members of the UVF in the North, it is inconceivable to the McGlinchey family that the Gardai have been unable to keep any, further progress in this inquiry.

However, the Gardaí stated that they were not watching McGlinchey, and that "he was not hiding. He drove his car around the town and was known to us here." They also stated that they did not believe that he had been engaged in criminal conspiracies or activities. Keane directly linked both McGlinchey's and his wife's deaths to the killings of McMahon and Mackin years before. Keane suggests that an associate of the dead men had already returned to Dundalk in 1989—when it had seemed as if McGlinchey's appeal might be successful—from abroad and had been open about his intentions if McGlinchey was released. Following McGlinchey's death, a number of stories appeared in the Irish press accusing him of drug dealing and other crimes, such as fencing stolen lorries from the border region. Coogan asserts that these stories were the product of Garda Special Branch press briefings.

Funeral

McGlinchey was buried in Bellaghy. Around 60 mourners, mostly family, saw off his body from Drogheda before the journey north. McAliskey kissed the coffin, which was carried by her, Sean McGlinchey, Dominic junior and Father O'Daly, who had given McGlinchey the last rites on Hardman's Gardens. The hearse was accompanied by what the Gardaí described as a "low key" security operation. Their spokesman said "we did not wish to flood the scene with Gardaí or there would have been more of them than mourners".

McGlinchey's funeral was held on 13 February 1994 in Bellaghy, with no republican accoutrements. There was no INLA colour party, and only an Irish tricolor draped over the coffin. Over 1,500 people attended watched closely by 200 RUC. Police armoured vans were held on the perimeter. McGlinchey was buried alongside Mary and their young daughter Máire. His coffin was carried from the McGlinchey family home to St Mary's Church by pall-bearers who were swapped out from the crowd every 40-yards or so. Martin McGuinness was among them, as was Bernadette McAliskey and her daughter Róisín. McGlinchey's sons carried the coffin for the final yards; comments Keane, "Dominic and Declan McGlinchey have seen more than most because of the troubles in Northern Ireland". The priest, Father Michael Flanagan, condemned what he called the media's glorification of McGlinchey's killing, telling the crowd "no-one deserved to die like that. There's a little bit of good in the worst of us and a little bit of bad in the best." Dillon's anonymous Provisional source confirmed that McGuinness's presence at the funeral indicated the high-standing as a soldier in which the IRA held McGlinchey, despite its disapproval of his organisation. McGlinchey's grave had a flagpole next to it from which a Tricolour flew after the burial. His grave lies a short distance from that of Francis Hughes, who had died on hunger strike in May 1981. Bernadette McAliskey gave the graveside oration, which effectively eulogised McGlinchey. She condemned the recent press coverage which had accused McGlinchey of drug dealing and criminality and said of the journalists responsible that they were

Curs and dogs. May every one of them rot in hell. They have taken away Dominic McGlinchey's character and they will stand judgement for it. He was the finest republican of them all. He never dishonoured the cause he believed in. His war was with the armed soldiers and the police of this state. 

Following this speech, some of the mourners turned on the observing press corps and shouted abuse, reported The Times. A couple of months after the funeral, McAliskey later explained her thinking to The Guardian. Their reporter, David Sharrock, asked if her tirade had been intended to counteract the negative stories about McGlinchey that had recently appeared in the press. McAliskey said

It's very difficult to conduct a conversation about a person who bore no resemblance in the media to the person I knew for 10 years. His thinking was just fundamentally democratic and to acknowledge that Dominic McGlinchey had an intellect was to acknowledge the reality of this conflict here. Republicanism is not simply anti-partitionist and confined to Ireland. It is a tradition of secular egalitarian democracy. So yes. Dominic was the finest republican of his generation. The rest of it I might take back...I don't even believe in hell.

In the New Statesman the following month, the journalist and political activist Eamonn McCann—discussing Sinn Féin's "search for respectability"—considered the speech of his "old comrade" McAliskey, which he said he had been "taken aback by the ferocity" of. However, said McCann, in context this was less surprising than should otherwise have been expected. The press coverage of McGlinchey's death, argued McCann, suggested that "the killing had been a good thing [and] the details of how he died were recounted with undisguised relish". The focus, he said, was on portraying McGlinchey was different from the brand of Irish republicanism that was increasingly becoming part of mainstream political discourse.

Family and personal life
McGlinchey was raised a Catholic and remained so for the rest of his life, although he described himself as a "believing one" rather than a practising one.

While imprisoned, on 5 July 1975 McGlinchey married Mary, daughter of Patrick O'Neil from Toomebridge. The author Ed Moloney describes her as a "formidable" women, who became an "experienced and ruthless operator in her own right". Dominic and Mary McGlinchey had two sons, Declan, born in 1978, and Dominic, who was a year younger. They also had a daughter Maíre, in 1985; she died of meningitis the following year.

Three of McGlinchey's brothers joined the IRA. Sean was convicted of the 1973 Coleraine bombings and received a life sentence; he became a Sinn Féin councillor after the Belfast Agreement. Paul was jailed for 14 years after attempting to assassinate the Reverend Overend in 1976—whom the INLA would later try and blow up on McGlinchey's orders; he later stood against Sinn Féin in the 2007 Assembly election. A third brother, Michael, was convicted of IRA membership. McGlinchey's son Declan was also active in the republican socialist movement and remained living in Bellaghy. In 2009 he was arrested and investigated under suspicion of involvement in the Real IRA's attack on Masereene Barracks. Declan died of a suspected heart attack in Bellaghy on 31 October 2015. He was given what the Irish News described as a "paramilitary-style funeral", involving a masked colour party and a gun salute the night before. His brother, Dominic Óg supported the Adams-McGuinness Sinn Féin leadership until 2007, when they endorsed the PSNI. He has been critical of the party since, describing them as "not too different to that of any corporate company". Since then, however, he has stated that he does not "see mass appetite at a street level for the armed campaign", and has stated his wish to "start to have a conversation about the removal of the gun from Irish politics" with dissident groups. He is also involved in broader left-wing activism such as opposition to the Iraq War. Dominic, like Declan, was also named in court as having been implicated in the Masereerne attack, which he denied. On his father's death, Dominic Óg is reported as believing that McGlinchey was killed in order to remove a potential obstacle to the burgeoning Peace Process.

Aftermath and legacy

Aftermath
McGlinchey's death did not stop the INLA's internal feuding, and by this point, says Coogan, it had also turned to drug dealing and racketeering. In 1996, another INLA chief of staff—Gino Gallagher—was also shot dead, probably by a rival faction. This led to a further bloody feud. McGlinchey had "helped keep the INLA on the map after the hunger strike", says Davies, and Holland and McDonald suggest that the INLA's fragmentation after his death indicates McGlinchey's importance to the organisation. They argued that he acted as "a makeshift bolt"; while he was alive, and particularly while he was operational, the bolt had held the component parts of the group together. But with his death, "that terror machine finally broke into disparate parts. The descent into chaos had begun." Although the armed struggle continued, it was generally ineffectual. The INLA cast itself as defenders of the Catholic community and tried to take the war to Loyalism. However, over the next few years the group killed over 40 civilians and 10 of its own volunteers while accounting for only five loyalists.

Legacy
The scholar Arwel Ellis Owen has blamed McGlinchey for the INLA's subsequent descent into factionalism, which he argues was a direct result of McGlinchey's being on the run throughout his leadership. His enforced absence, Owen suggests, prevented him from taking day-to-day control. This was particularly caused by McGlinchey's emasculation of the Army Council and collective decision-making processes; when he left, there was no-one to fill the vacuum his departure created. The INLA's increased focus on internecine feuding also distracted them their political or strategic aims. and  McGlinchey has also been criticised for failing to support the political struggle waged by the IRSP. Their finances were consistently low or non-existent and they relied on the military wing to provide them with funds. Little was forthcoming, in spite of the INLA's numerous successful robberies. McGlinchey appears, therefore, to have had little interest in any form of struggle other than the military. This was despite, note Holland and McDonald, of concerns raised by seasoned INLA men such as Harry Flynn and Gerry Roche that socialist politics and activity was fundamental to the existence of both groups. Despite McGlinchey's claim that his priority for the republican socialist movement to provide "political leadership on the class struggle in Ireland", argues the author Daniel Finn, politics "withered on the vine" under his command. McGlinchey, commented the author Thomas G. Mitchell, "had minimal interest in the party. Instead, he wanted to ake the INLA the most ruthless and feared terrorist group in Northern Ireland." Although McAliskey praised the memory of McGlinchey, in practical terms, suggest Holland and McDonald, his "effect on the organisation Mrs McAliskey once supported was negative", and his legacy should be seen as division and paranoia within the INLA, they suggest.  It is possible that, before he was killed, McGlinchey had come to regret leaving the IRA. One of their ex-volunteers told Dillon that had McGlinchey remained with the Provisionals, they "would have stood him down from active service. He'd probably still be alive and part of the peace process." Alternatively, it has been suggested that McGlinchey had already been identified by elements within the IRA opposed to Sinn Féin's peace strategy as a potential future rallying point for dissidents.

Dermot Finucane, brother of murdered Belfast solicitor Pat Finucane, later told the investigative author Kevin Toolis that the "Wanted" posters put up about McGlinchey and Hughes influenced him to join the IRA in 1978. Finucane told Toolis how "I remember seeing Dominic McGlinchey and Ian Milne and Francis Hughes 'Wanted' posters when they were on the run as the most wanted men in Ulster, and I remember mentally saying: 'That is what you want, you want to inflict so much damage on the enemy they want you badly'". McGlinchey was commemorated in the INLA wing of the Maze Prison with a mural on a communal wall. McGlinchey is portrayed in a black beret and against a fiery background and a silhouetted hillside. The caption read "Comrade Dominic McGlinchey. Proudly remembered by the INLA POWs. Long Kesh". Similarly, the scholar Paul K. Clare said that, while researching public opinion in Northern Ireland, he asked a group of young men in Turf Lodge "if there was any one individual who they admired more than anyone else. 'Mad Dog' McGlinchey" was their reply." Such views, argues Clare, were "not so uncommon that they would be considered abnormal".

Personality and reputation

Personality and approach 
The author Martin Dillon met McGlinchey in the mid-1980s and described him as "six feet tall, and lean, with a receding hairline. In his 30s, his slightly rounded face gave him the look of a much younger man." Coogan also visited McGlinchey in Portlaoise and wrote that he appeared "tired, reduced by his past and by prison". He had a tricolour tattoo on his left forearm. The Gardaí later described McGlinchey as vain, and enjoying melodrama. Edna O'Brien described him as "most reflective and at the same time most forthcoming". She later told Marianne Heron of the Irish Independent that she had told McGlinchey "that she liked everything about him except what he was [and] he told her that his mother said the same thing". O'Brien also denied ever having an affair with McGlinchey; she claimed later that, as a result of her research for a book, she had to refute questions as to whether she "had love affairs with republicans". His reputation, suggests the writer Jonathan Stevenson, became that of "fabled killer", while Coogan describes him as "a latter-day Ned Kelly",  as committed to republicanism as Frances Hughes yet with far greater notoriety. He was also, suggest Holland and McDonald, "probably the most famous and most charismatic INLA chief of staff since Séamus Costello". Where Costello ruled by collective agreement, though, McGlinchey ruled by decree; his tenure as INLA chief of staff has been summed up as "brutal, authoritarian, but nonetheless still relatively cohesive" by researcher Gary Ackerman.

McGlinchey, at his own estimate, killed "around...30" people in his career, of whom all but one, he said, were members of the security forces; the historian Keith Jeffrey has calculated that McGlinchey was responsible for 28 murders, 30 bombings and 11 armed robberies. According to the journalist Nicholas Davies, his victims were "mainly officers of the RUC, the army and the UDR. He also murdered civilians." Holland and McDonald suggest that during his tenure as Chief of Staff McGlinchey "held the organisation together" at a time when it was expected to implode. McGlinchey, a contemporary said, "made his own luck", and Davies described McGlinchey as "a fearless man who would take extraordinary risks", particularly in his tactic of close-quarters engagements. The scholar C. M. Drake notes, however, that "where there is little protection for a human target...a close-quarter assassination is a simple option".

After his death, an IRSP spokesman, Fra Halligan defended McGlinchey's lack of political idealism, pointing out that he "wouldn't have had any problem saying [so] to you". For example, when Adams ideologically linked the republican campaign to the ANC's struggles in South Africa against Apartheid, McGlinchey is claimed to have said that, in rural nationalist areas "they don't know anything about Mandela but they see Brits in their fields and they don't like it". McGlinchey summed up his own approach as being "to do what had to be done and don't think about it thereafter". Although he was never completely unafraid, he said—"you need a certain amount of fear to keep you on edge"—he believed in controlling his fear and that, ultimately, he had a stronger motivation to fight than his enemy. He also claimed to take no pleasure in killing. During his interview with Vincent Browne, Browne asked him what his greatest regret was. After a pause, McGlinchey told him about a Protestant boy he had grown up with. The boy had joined the RUC and subsequently been killed by the IRA; "McGlinchey said he felt badly about that".

The ex-volunteer who spoke to Dillon also discussed McGlinchey's approach to various aspects of his leadership. He commented, for example, with regard to McGlinchey's views on informers ("a bullet in the head—no messing"), drugs (not tolerated), civilian casualties ("he would just say it was war") and sectarianism ("he took the view that if they killed our people, we should strike back but he didn't spend his time going around saying "let's kill all the Prods"). He concludes that McGlinchey "was not a holy Joe, but his main targets were the British war machine". A Gardaí source told The Times, "he lived by the gun and died by the gun. He was not a man who was going to die in his bed of old age". McGlinchey saw himself similarly. In an interview with the Starry Plough, he commented—when asked what the effect of his death or capture would have—that "the movement will not end with me. I'm only one individual, not God." He also refuted that he had ever, or ever would, become a legend, telling a journalist "I'm no Che Guevara, just an ordinary Irish republican socialist who is determined to strive for a free socialist Ireland". O'Kane compared his and his wife's cooperation as having a "touch of Bonnie and Clyde" about them, she wrote.

McGlinchey's falling out with the Provisionals in the late 1970s, commented an anonymous colleague, indicated that he could issue orders but was a very poor follower of them. Other ex-comrades have since described him as "volatile and impulsive", and his approach to man-management as "if you're on the run you should be armed. If not, fuck off home." Another called him a "cunning countryman [who] liked to manipulate others but did not like to be in overall responsibility". His treatment of popular and previously loyal INLA men such as Barkley convinced many of those under him that he would brook no dissent or questioning of his orders. The result was bad news for the INLA's cohesion, as paranoia and fear became widespread. to the extent that, when attending Army Council meetings, say Holland and McDonald, some members would only go armed. However, they also argue, it could never be said of McGlinchey, as it could of so many of his colleagues, that his struggle was motivated by personal gain: he was motivated solely by ideology. One such fellow traveller of McGlinchey's later described the INLA leader thus:He wasn't the mad dog the media talked about. He was very focussed. People would listen when he talked. He had a grasp of international politics and often discussed the agendas of other revolutionary movements. He wanted to see the INLA as part of an international socialist brigade. He was also a hard man and when anyone stepped out of line—God help him or her.

Reputation 
Christopher S. Morrison of the University of Wisconsin-Madison describes McGlinchey as earning "a personal reputation for sheer readiness to murder that no single republican figure of the Troubles has come close to challenging". A lieutenant general in the British Army, Maurice Robert Johnston, later described McGlinchey as a "lunatic", and more of an enemy to the British government than Martin McGuinness. McGlinchey not only lacked McGuinness's restraint, said Johnston, but would "shoot his own mother and all the rest of it". McGlinchey's "Mad Dog" nickname was given him by the security services—the modern historian Ruán O'Donnell calls the term a "pejorative soubriquet"—who considered him a "psycho". Dillon suggests that, in reality, the army did not consider him a mad dog but a "committed terrorist who had proved...dangerous and unpredictable", while the investigative journalist Mark Urban says McGlinchey had "driven the INLA into active and reasonably effective terrorism". The former INLA Chief of Staff—who McGlinchey had failed to re-recruit in the late 1970s—later told how he was ultimately deterred when he considered the direction McGlinchey wanted to take the group in. Holland and Mcdonald tell how—the two men having shared a cell in Portlaoise for some time—the ex-chief considered McGlinchey to be "unpredictable", and that his involvement increased the likelihood of a bloodbath at some point. A Garda who knew McGlinchey during his last term of imprisonment said that notwithstanding the urbane, academic facade McGlinchey adopted, he was still "a complete dictator" who wanted to dominate all around him.

The label "Mad Dog", argue Holland and McDonald, is a misnomer: he was neither mad nor a dog. For example, they say, by the time of his death he was sufficiently well versed in the constitution—the result of his studies in Portlaoise—to cogently argue against the Downing Street Declaration, which was being negotiated shortly before he died. Republicans tended to ignore the "Mad Dog" and "psycho" tags, which they deemed to part of what they believed to be a normal British propaganda campaign, albeit, says the author Gene Kerrigan, "in a cartoon fashion, as a bogeyman". Ackerman has argued that the fact McGlinchey was able to spend so long on the run demonstrates the level of support he enjoyed in the countryside. Another of McGlinchey's Portlaoise companions argued that he was comparable to the hero of a previous generation of republicans, O'Donovan Rossa, while the literary critic Richard Pine has called McGlinchey's career of violence part of the continuing republican theme, arguing that the "'religion of ecstasy' which carried Emmet, Pearse and Plunkett through the blood-sacrifice has also...sustained Terence McSwiney in 1920, the hunger-strikers in Long Kesh and sustain[ed] Dominic McGlinchey". McCann argued that McGlinchey "wasn't way out of line with, and can't be cast from, the mainstream history of nationalist Ireland".

At his last trial, McGlinchey's defence counsel argued that, like thousands of others of his generation, "but for the fact that he was born in the community of South Derry, it is highly unlikely that he would ever be before any court". Holland and McDonald believed that McGlinchey would have known he would not meet with a peaceful death. On one occasion he stated his belief that "I will be remembered for nothing. I have no illusions about myself. There is no glory or anything to this. The only people who will remember me will be my family and particularly my children." It is possible that the June 1993 assassination attempt had brought out a fatalistic quality in him, for during one interview he commented on his nickname, saying "what do you do with a Mad Dog except put it down?". Before his death, he told a local detective "you either hide or you go on living as long as you can". Vincent Browne asked McGlinchey what he thought would happen to him eventually. McGlinchey answered:

I will probably get shot. There is a good possibility of my not seeing the end of the struggle. I could be lucky but just because I have been set up by the media as the most wanted man in Ireland, I suppose that increases the chances of my getting done in. But I don't really give it a lot of thought, I always try to avoid being shot.

Cultural depictions

In the early 1990s novelist Edna O'Brien interviewed McGlinchey several times in Portlaoise while meticulously researching her novel House of Splendid Isolation. In the novel, the protagonist is an on-the-run republican terrorist named Roger McGreevy. Believing he has found an empty house to hole up in, he discovers an elderly woman in residence. The narrative explores the evolving relationship between the two, which moves from fear and distrust on her part to "a sort of mutual liking, even tenderness", writes the critic John Dunne, although noting that McGreevy "is no Mad Dog". The scholar Richard Bradford argues that the novel indicates a degree of "macabre" hero worship on behalf of O'Brien towards McGlinchey, upon whom scholars accept she generally based the character and who she treats with concomitant sympathy: McGreevy describes himself as seeking "Justice. Personal identity. Truth". Similarities between McGreevy and McGlinchey include their wives having been killed previously, both being interned at a young age and both spending their lives on the run. O'Brien, comments the researcher John Maher, "builds up, through the old woman's interactions with McGreevy, an increasingly sympathetic picture of the terrorist [which] reflects O 'Brien's own strong republican sympathies". O'Brien's interviews with McGlinchey were themselves notorious, and demonstrated her willingness to court controversy. O'Brien herself denied that the character was McGlinchey. She countered that, while "he certainly played a strong part in the people that talked to me", McGreevy was a composite of many different men.

The central character of Martin McDonagh's 2001 black comedy—and "satire on sectarian violence"—The Lieutenant of Inishmore, Padraic, was based on the public image of McGlinchey, according to Morrison. Set against the backdrop of the early days of the Peace Process, "Mad Patrick" is stated to be a member of the INLA in 1993 Ireland. Padraic's activities involve pulling out the toenails of drug dealers, assassination and torture. Morrison, though, argues that "some of McDonagh's information was derived from a highly inaccurate image of McGlinchey provided by sensationalist British and Irish newspaper reports at the time of the prolific murderer's heyday", and argues that, unknowingly, McDonagh has reiterated this image. The author Henry McDonald, writing in The Guardian, agrees that Padraic "bears some comparison with the real life" of McGlinchey, as both are portrayed as being "too extreme even for the Provisional IRA".

A 2007 Irish film reinterpretion of Macbeth—retitled Mickey B. and filmed in Maghaberry Prison—was set against the backdrop of prison drug dealing. The murder of Macduff's family in act IV scene ii, comments the director Tom Magill, "draws heavily" on the 1987 murder of Mary McGlinchey while bathing her children. Magill later explained

The central figure in Shane MacGown's 1997 song Paddy Public Enemy No. 1 is based on McGlinchey; when asked his opinion of him, MacGowan said "he was a great man". The Irish Brigade's ballad, "Hands Up, Trousers Down" referenced McGlinchey's treatment of the Gardaí while on the run.

See also
 Timeline of Irish National Liberation Army actions

Notes

References

Bibliography

External link

1954 births
1994 deaths
Date of birth missing
Irish National Liberation Army members
Irish republicans
Irish republicans imprisoned under Prevention of Terrorism Acts
Irish republicans interned without trial
Overturned convictions in the United Kingdom
People extradited from Ireland
People extradited to the United Kingdom
People from County Londonderry
People killed during The Troubles (Northern Ireland)
Provisional Irish Republican Army members